A Basket of Leaves is a collection of 54 essays by Geoff Wisner, each of which examines one or more books about a different African country. The collection was published by Jacana Media in 2007.

The authors of the selected books are (variously) African, American, West Indian, and European. Some of the authors are black, and others are white. Some of the books are fiction, and others are non-fiction; 28 of them were authored or co-authored by women. The selected works were originally published in Arabic, English, French, German, Polish, Portuguese, and other languages.

Reviewed works

References

Further reading
 

Literature about literature
2007 non-fiction books